Bruce John Cramer Webb (27 November 1939 – 6 April 2020) was an Australian rules footballer who played with Geelong in the Victorian Football League (VFL).

Notes

External links 

1939 births
Australian rules footballers from Victoria (Australia)
Geelong Football Club players
2020 deaths